Stein Amundsen (born 9 February 1966) is a retired Norwegian football striker.

He started his career in Drøbak-Frogn and was picked up by Lillestrøm SK in 1988. His career was crowned with the 1989 1. divisjon title, which he secured with the decisive winning goal. He amassed 66 league games over four seasons. He was bought by Lyn in 1992, eventually being converted to midfielder as well as team captain. He played the 1994 Norwegian Football Cup Final, which Lyn lost.

Upon retiring in 1997, he entered dentist training and eventually settled as a dentist in Hvitsten. He married and had one daughter.

References

1966 births
Living people
People from Frogn
Norwegian footballers
Lillestrøm SK players
Lyn Fotball players
Norwegian First Division players
Eliteserien players
Association football forwards
Norway under-21 international footballers
Sportspeople from Viken (county)